House of Mystery is a 1961 British supernatural mystery film. It was based on a play director Vernon Sewell had filmed three times before. It was known in Germany as Das Landhaus des Dr. Lemming ("The Country House of Dr. Lemming"), and because of its compact running time, aired in the U.S. as an episode of the TV series "Kraft Mystery Theatre".

Plot
A pair of newlyweds visit an old cottage for sale in the country, and hear the housekeeper's account of its macabre history. The previous owners had been disturbed by paranormal activity, and on calling in a medium, the ghost was identified as an eccentric and vengeful scientist, once resident in the cottage. The scientist was obsessed with electricity, and when his unfaithful wife and her lover attempted to murder him, he responded by electrifying the living room floor and fixtures, and challenging the couple to escape.

Cast
Stella Lemming -	Jane Hylton
Mark Lemming -	Peter Dyneley
Joan Trevor -	Nanette Newman
Henry Trevor -	Maurice Kaufmann
Burdon -	Colin Gordon
Clive -	John Merivale
Young Husband -	Ronald Hines
His Wife -	Colette Wilde
Mrs Bucknall -	Molly Urquhart
Constable -	George Selway
Milkman -	John Abineri

Critical reception
 The Radio Times gave the film three out of five stars, saying, "this is a neat little spine-tingler from writer/director Vernon Sewell, who was something of a dab hand at summoning up demons from beyond, whether benign as in The Ghosts of Berkeley Square or downright menacing as in The Blood Beast Terror. Some aficionados would insist that if it ain't Hammer it ain't horror, but there are plenty of uneasy moments in this haunting story, in which a couple of newlyweds learn the grim secret of their dream house."
 The Bloody Pit of Horror wrote, "though modest, ultimately predictable and nothing spectacular, it's well-acted and at least manages to maintain interest."
 Britmovie called the film an "effectively macabre little b-movie narrated in several multi-layered flashbacks."

References

External links
 

1961 films
1961 horror films
British supernatural horror films
British haunted house films
British black-and-white films
Supernatural thriller films
Films set in country houses
British horror films
1960s English-language films
British independent films
1960s British films